John Palmer Bruce Chichester, 1st Baronet  (c. 1794 – 20 December 1851) was an English Whig politician who sat in the House of Commons from 1831 to 1841.

Chichester was the son of Colonel John Chichester of Arlington Court, Barnstaple. He served in the Royal Navy. Chichester became High Sheriff of Cardiganshire in 1831 when he was living at Llanbadarn Fawr, Cardiganshire.

At the 1831 general election Chichester was elected Member of Parliament (MP) for Barnstaple. He held the seat until 1841. He was created a baronet in 1840.

Chichester died at the age of 57.

Chichester married Caroline Thistlethwayte. Their son Alexander inherited the baronetcy.

References

Further reading

External links
 

1790s births
1851 deaths
Whig (British political party) MPs for English constituencies
Members of the Parliament of the United Kingdom for Barnstaple
UK MPs 1832–1835
UK MPs 1831–1832
UK MPs 1835–1837
UK MPs 1837–1841
Baronets in the Baronetage of the United Kingdom
High Sheriffs of Cardiganshire